Pat Kerrins (born 13 September 1936 in Fulham, London) is an English former footballer who played in the Football League as an outside left for Queens Park Rangers, Crystal Palace and Southend United.

Kerrins came through the youth ranks at Queens Park Rangers, turned professional in December 1953 and made his debut in February 1954 in a goalless draw against Exeter City. He went on to play 146 league games for Rangers, scoring 30 league goals, then transferred to Crystal Palace in 1960 and later had spells at Southend United and non-league Romford.

References

1936 births
Living people
Footballers from Fulham
English footballers
Association football wingers
Queens Park Rangers F.C. players
Crystal Palace F.C. players
Southend United F.C. players
Romford F.C. players
English Football League players